Back River may refer to various watercourses:

Australia
 Back River (Tamworth), a tributary of the Barnard River in New South Wales
 Back River (Cooma-Monaro), a tributary of the Tuross River in New South Wales
 Back River (Victoria), a tributary of the Timbarra River in Victoria

Canada
 Back River (Nunavut)
 Rivière des Prairies in Quebec, also known in English as Back River
 Atlatzi River, British Columbia, formerly known as the Back River

Jamaica
 Back River (Jamaica)

United States
 Back River (Kennebec River), a river in coastal Maine, in the combined estuary of the Sheepscot and the Kennebec rivers
 Back River (Sheepscot River), a short tidal channel in the town of Boothbay, Maine
 Back River (Meduncook River), a short tributary of the Meduncook River in Friendship, Maine
 Back River (Medomak River), river in Friendship, Maine, which empties into the estuary of the Medomak River
 Back River (Saint George River), a tributary of the Saint George River in Knox County, Maine
 Back River (Maryland), a tidal estuary in Baltimore County, Maryland
 Back River (Powwow River), a tributary of the Powwow River in New Hampshire and Massachusetts
 Back River (Buzzards Bay), a small tidal estuary in Bourne, Massachusetts
 Back River (Massachusetts Bay), which flows into Duxbury Bay
 Back River (Merrimac, Massachusetts), a much smaller tributary of the Powwow River
 Weymouth Back River, in Weymouth, Massachusetts
 Back River (Berkeley County, South Carolina), a small tributary of the Cooper River (South Carolina)
 Back River (Virginia), an estuarine inlet of the Chesapeake Bay between Hampton and Poquoson, Virginia
 Back River (Savannah River), a secondary channel of the Savannah River, southeastern US